Balbhadra Singh (April 16, 1916–1967) was the 12th ruler of the former princely state of Raghogarh in the present-day Guna district of Madhya Pradesh, India, and a former elected member of the legislative assembly. He became a Member of the Legislative Assembly (MLA) as independent candidate for the Raghogarh Vidhan Sabha constituency. He was a member of the Indian National Congress till 1947 but remained independent thereafter till his death in 1967.

Balbhadra Singh was the father of two politician sons, Digvijaya Singh and Lakshman Singh.

References

1914 births
1967 deaths
Madhya Pradesh MLAs 1952–1957
People from Guna district
Indian royalty